František Jež (born 16 December 1970) is a Czechoslovakian/Czech former ski jumper.

Career
At the 1992 Winter Olympics in Albertville, he won a bronze medal in the Team Large Hill. Jež also won a silver medal in the team large hill at the 1993 FIS Nordic World Ski Championships in Falun. His biggest successes were in 1990 when he won four times at the FIS Ski jumping World Cup.

World Cup

Standings

Wins

External links
 
 

Czech male ski jumpers
Czechoslovak male ski jumpers
1970 births
Living people
Olympic bronze medalists for Czechoslovakia
Ski jumpers at the 1992 Winter Olympics
Ski jumpers at the 1998 Winter Olympics
Olympic medalists in ski jumping
FIS Nordic World Ski Championships medalists in ski jumping
Medalists at the 1992 Winter Olympics
Olympic ski jumpers of Czechoslovakia
People from Valašské Meziříčí
Sportspeople from the Zlín Region